is a Japanese football player. He plays for Iwate Grulla Morioka.

Career
Shogo Shimohata joined Kyoto Sanga from the club's youth team in 2011. He made his professional debut in the Emperor's Cup on January 1, 2012, in a final match against FC Tokyo. He moved to the Japan Football League club Sagawa Printing in 2012. In 2013, he returned to Kyoto Sanga.

Club statistics
Updated to 14 April 2020.

References

External links

 Profile at Kyoto Sanga FC
 
 Official blog 

1992 births
Living people
Association football people from Shiga Prefecture
Japanese footballers
J2 League players
J3 League players
Japan Football League players
Kyoto Sanga FC players
SP Kyoto FC players
Iwate Grulla Morioka players
Association football defenders